José María Romero Poyón (born 10 December 1978), known as José Mari, is a Spanish former footballer who played as a forward.

He amassed La Liga totals of 270 matches and 49 goals over 11 seasons, mainly with Atlético Madrid – for which he signed at the age of 18 from Sevilla, going on to score 34 times in 144 appearances – and Villarreal (four years apiece). He also played professionally in Italy for Milan.

José Mari was a Spanish international in the 2000s.

Club career
José Mari was born in Seville, Andalusia. After growing through the ranks of local Sevilla FC (first appearing with the main squad aged just 18, in a 2–0 defeat at Rayo Vallecano on 5 March 1997, and making 21 La Liga appearances with seven goals during that season, as his team was finally relegated), he signed with Atlético Madrid.

At Atlético, José Mari totalled 18 league goals in his first two seasons. Highlights included scoring at both home and away wins over Real Madrid in the year 1999 (separate seasons, both by 3–1); these happened to be Atlético's only competitive victories in the Madrid derby in a span covering almost 20 years.

José Mari failed to settle in Italy after a €19 million move to A.C. Milan in January 2000 – Atlético were relegated at the end of the campaign – and was subsequently loaned out to the Colchoneros during 2002–03, their first back in the top flight after a two-year absence. His second spell there was less successful, with the high point being a hat-trick in a 3–3 home draw against Athletic Bilbao on 10 November 2002.

José Mari agreed to a deal at Villarreal CF in the summer of 2003, for an undisclosed fee. He went on to play a key role in that year's UEFA Intertoto Cup triumph, and the side's best-ever league finish (third in 2004–05, with four goals in 30 matches).

In 2007, after falling out of favour at Villarreal with the arrival of Giuseppe Rossi and the recovery of longtime injury absentee Nihat Kahveci, José Mari returned to Seville, joining Real Betis on a one-year deal. He scored his first goal for his new club more than a year after his arrival, on 24 September 2008, in a 3–2 away loss to FC Barcelona; despite still having a contract running until June 2010, he was released in late December and, late in the following month, moved to the second division and moved to Gimnàstic de Tarragona.

In June 2010, after one and a half seasons of regular playing time, with six league goals in his last year, José Mari became a free agent and was released. In the following month, the 31-year-old signed for Xerez CD, recently relegated to the second tier. He netted a career-best 17 times in his first season – 33 games, all starts – helping his team to the eighth position.

International career
José Mari represented Spain on four occasions, in a two-year span. His debut came on 25 April 2001 as he played the second half of a 1–0 friendly win over Japan, in Córdoba.

Previously, José Mari was a member of the national squad which won the silver medal at the 2000 Summer Olympics in Sydney. He scored three goals during the competition.

Post-retirement
After retiring, José Mari began practicing bodybuilding.

Career statistics
Scores and results list Spain's goal tally first, score column indicates score after each José Mari goal.

Honours
Villarreal
UEFA Intertoto Cup: 2003, 2004

Spain U23
Summer Olympic silver medal: 2000

References

External links

1978 births
Living people
Footballers from Seville
Spanish footballers
Association football forwards
La Liga players
Segunda División players
Segunda División B players
Sevilla Atlético players
Sevilla FC players
Atlético Madrid footballers
Villarreal CF players
Real Betis players
Gimnàstic de Tarragona footballers
Xerez CD footballers
Serie A players
A.C. Milan players
Spain youth international footballers
Spain under-21 international footballers
Spain under-23 international footballers
Spain international footballers
Olympic footballers of Spain
Footballers at the 2000 Summer Olympics
Olympic silver medalists for Spain
Medalists at the 2000 Summer Olympics
Olympic medalists in football
Spanish expatriate footballers
Expatriate footballers in Italy
Spanish expatriate sportspeople in Italy